The Pillnitz Kleinzschachwitz Ferry, also known as the Schlossfähre, is a ferry across the Elbe river in Germany. It carries both passengers and cars.

The ferry service is operated by the Dresdner Verkehrsbetriebe (DVB), Dresden's municipal transport authority, and carries the number F14 in the Verkehrsverbund Oberelbe route numbering scheme. It operates every 15 minutes throughout the day. It is the only vehicle ferry operated by DVB, although they also operate a fleet of smaller passenger ferries.

The car used on the service is named Schloßfähre, is diesel powered, and is propelled using Schottel pump jets. It can carry 140 passenger and 8 cars, or 350 passengers if no cars are carried. If necessary, vessels from the DVB's fleet of four passenger-only ferries may also be used on the crossing.

See also 
 Pillnitz Castle
 Pillnitz

References 

Dresdner Verkehrsbetriebe
Ferries across Elbe
Ferry transport in Saxony
Transport in Dresden